Nodar Itonishvili (born 14 November 1987) is a former Georgian tennis player.

Itonishvili has a career-high ATP singles ranking of 1,058, achieved on 18 August 2008. He also has a career-high ATP doubles ranking of 1,129, achieved on 29 April 2013.

Itonishvili has represented Georgia at Davis Cup, where he has a win-loss record of 0-9.

Future and Challenger finals

Doubles: 2 (0–2)

Davis Cup

Participations: (0–9)

   indicates the outcome of the Davis Cup match followed by the score, date, place of event, the zonal classification and its phase, and the court surface.

References

External links

1987 births
Living people
Male tennis players from Georgia (country)